The 1964 Open Championship was the 93rd Open Championship, played 8–10 July at the Old Course in St Andrews, Scotland. Tony Lema won his only major championship, five strokes ahead of runner-up Jack Nicklaus. He led by seven strokes after 54 holes and shot a final round 70. Neither had played the Old Course before and Lema had never played in Britain; he gave much of the credit for his victory to his caddy, Tip Anderson. It was Lema's fourth victory in six weeks; he won three events on the PGA Tour in June. Nicklaus equaled the course record with a 66 in the third round.

The PGA Championship was played the next week in Columbus, Ohio, one of five times in the 1960s that these two majors were played in consecutive weeks in July.

Lema played in two more Opens; two weeks after competing in 1966 at Muirfield, he and his pregnant wife were killed in a plane crash near Chicago.

Course

^ The 10th hole was posthumously named for Bobby Jones in 1972

Previous lengths of the course for The Open Championship (since 1950):
  - 1960, 1955

Field
The exemption categories were:

1. The first 20 and those tying for 20th place in the 1963 Open
Brian Allen, Peter Alliss, Bob Charles (3), Neil Coles, Max Faulkner, Jean Garaïalde, Harold Henning, Brian Huggett, Bernard Hunt, Alex King, Malcolm Leeder, Hugh Lewis, Ian MacDonald, John MacDonald, Sebastian Miguel, Kel Nagle (3), Jack Nicklaus (5), Christy O'Connor Snr, Frank Phillips, Gary Player (3), Phil Rodgers, Sewsunker Sewgolum, Ramón Sota, Peter Thomson (3), Brian Wilkes

2. The first 30 and those tying for 30th place in the P.G.A. Order of Merit for 1963

3. The last 10 Open champions (1954–63)
Bobby Locke
Entered but later withdrew: Arnold Palmer (5)

4. The last 5 Amateur champions (1959–63)
Deane Beman (6) (a), Michael Bonallack (a), Joe Carr (a)
Eligible but did not enter:  Richard Davies, Michael Lunt

5. The last 10 U.S. Open champions (1954–63)
Eligible but did not enter: Tommy Bolt, Julius Boros, Billy Casper, Jack Fleck, Ed Furgol, Gene Littler, Dick Mayer, Cary Middlecoff

6. The last 5 U.S. Amateur champions (1959–63)
Eligible but did not enter: Labron Harris Jr.
Jack Nicklaus had turned professional but was exempt under other categories

7. The first 30 money winners and those tying for 30th place in the U.S.P.G.A. official list for one year ending with the P.G.A. tournament immediately before the closing date of the U.S. Open entries

Exemptions for amateur champions were only granted if the player was still an amateur.

Qualification took place on 3–4 July (Friday and Saturday) at the New and Eden courses. They were run as two separate events with 35 players to qualify from the New Course and 34 from the Eden course, together with 51 exemptions to make a total field of 120. The number of alternates was reduced from three to two.

Past champions in the field

Made the cut

Missed the cut

Round summaries

First round
Wednesday, 8 July 1964

Source:

Second round
Thursday, 9 July 1964

Source:
Amateurs: Beman (+13), Bonallack (+13), Carr (+13), Clark (+16), Rutherford (+17), Saddler (+17), Shade (+21).

Third round
Friday, 10 July 1964 (morning)

Source:

Final round
Friday, 10 July 1964 (afternoon)
 

Source:

References

External links
St Andrews 1964 (Official site)

The Open Championship
Golf tournaments in Scotland
Open Championship
Open Championship
Open Championship